The 2006 Air Canada Cup was the fourth edition of the women's ice hockey tournament. It was held from January 5-7, 2006 in Ravensburg, Germany. The Canadian U23 national team won the tournament, finishing with a record of two wins and one loss over three games.

Tournament

Results

Final table

External links
Tournament on hockeyarchives.info

2006–07
2006–07 in women's ice hockey
2006–07 in Swiss ice hockey
2006–07 in German ice hockey
2006–07 in Canadian women's ice hockey
2006–07 in Finnish ice hockey
2006